Spend an Evening with Saddle Creek is a documentary focusing on the first ten years of the Saddle Creek scene in Omaha, Nebraska. It was released in 2005 by Plexifilm. It was directed by Jason Kulbel and Rob Walters.

Interviews for the film were conducted in December 2003 and January 2004 with the active bands on the Saddle Creek roster at that time. Since the "cast" is limited to these current members, bands such as Beep Beep, Criteria, and Two Gallants do not make an appearance.

Bands featured
Azure Ray
Bright Eyes
Cursive
Desaparecidos
The Faint
The Good Life
Mayday
Now It's Overhead
Rilo Kiley
Son, Ambulance
Sorry About Dresden

See also
Saddle Creek Records

External links
Plexifilm: Spend an Evening with Saddle Creek
Saddle Creek Records
Saddle Creek Records online store
Spend an Evening with Saddle Creek at Amazon.com

2005 films
Documentary films about music and musicians
American documentary films
2005 documentary films
2000s English-language films
2000s American films